Joel Zamel (born 1986) is an Australian-Israeli inventor, entrepreneur, owner and operator of private intelligence and political analysis agencies which offer forecasting simulations, wargaming, influence operations, social media campaigns, private investment brokering and election campaign strategy. Such firms include Wikistrat, a geostrategic consultancy firm, Joel Zamel Investment Group (JZIG), White Knight, and Psy-Group, an agency specializing in counter-extremism activities and social media operations.

Early life and education
Joel Zamel was born in Australia in 1986, the son of Gary Zamel, a wealthy Australian mining engineer and businessman predominantly related to coal, nickel and copper mining and previous Director of the Australian Israel Chamber of Commerce. Gary Zamel also has done work for his son's company Wikistrat.
Zamel attended the University of New South Wales in Sydney, where he obtained a Bachelor of Mining Engineering and later moved to Israel studying at the Interdisciplinary Center, Herzliya, specializing in Counter-Terrorism and Homeland Security graduating with a master's degree in government, Diplomacy and Strategy. He's a member of the Central Eurasia Leadership Alliance (CELA) network.

Career
Joel Zamel gained widespread visibility and public attention in 2018, after a number of media sources reported about Wikistrat during Robert Mueller's Special Counsel investigation. 
Zamel is the founder of a number of private intelligence and political analysis agencies including Wikistrat, a geostrategic consultancy firm, White Knight (a successor company to the now inactive firm known as Psy-Group).

Zamel's agencies have a broad network of analysts consisting primarily of former government officials and private experts. He is also an active investor in the cybersecurity sector, especially for those firms with a focus on CVE efforts.
He is reported to have established various social media influence companies based in Eastern Europe and Asia, and is known to have formed a close advisory team of  renowned former senior government officials who served at upper levels of government in the U.S., UK and Middle East.

In 2015 Zamel's Wikistrat spent a week running scenarios called the "Cyber Mercenaries project" on how a U.S. election interference campaign could be made by Russian cyber actors, which was later reported to Donald Trump Jr in 2016.

On August 3, 2016, Zamel participated in a high-level meeting with Donald Trump Jr., Erik Prince, Stephen Miller and George Nader. This was followed by a post inauguration meeting in December 2016 with George Nader, Steve Bannon former vice president of Cambridge Analytica, and Jared Kushner

After the 2016 Trump election win, Zamel's company Psy Group formed a partnership with Cambridge Analytica to jointly bid for contracts with the American Government. In December 2016, George Nader used WhiteKnight, based in the Philippines, to purchase a presentation demonstrating the impact of social media campaigns on Donald Trump's electoral victory.

Zamel had first met Nader at the St. Petersburg International Economic Forum in June 2016. In November 2016 George Nader paid Zamel $2M for undisclosed reasons. Prince then lied about it to congress.

The meeting with Trump was later scrutinised by Robert Mueller's Special Counsel investigation and subsequent investigations into his links to Trump officials, which continued after the Mueller investigation finished. Zamel's meetings with Saudi officials was also scrutinised by Mueller.

In February 2019, federal agents detained Zamel at a Washington airport and he appeared before a grand jury to give evidence to Robert Mueller about his links to George Nader. Zamel bragged to Nader that he had conducted a secret campaign which had been influential in Trump's victory, a characterisation which Zamel's lawyer has disputed. Zamel also had contact with Michael Flynn.

On April 5, 2019, the Senate Intelligence Committee sends letter to Walter Soriano the owner of USG Security Limited based in Britain for his communication with Paul Manafort, Michael Flynn, Psy-Group, Wikistrat, and Black Cube, Orbis Business Intelligence (a firm co-founded by Christopher Steele). Soriano has links to Oleg Deripaska.

Zamel's firms have completed work for Oleg V. Deripaska and Dmitry Rybolovlev.

Zamel has been represented by Marc Mukasey, who specialises in reputation protection. Mukasey, a former law partner of Rudy Giuliani, also had President Donald Trump as a client as well as Donald Trump Jr., Ivanka Trump, Eric Trump, and the Trump Foundation in response to the civil lawsuit filed by the New York State Attorney General's Office. as well as Eddie Gallagher a soldier accused of committing war crimes.

Beliefs

Zamel believes Bitcoin is a “truth machine protected by a fortress of misconceptions.” 

Zamel believes in information operations as an underutilized tool for countering extremist ideologies. He believes “dictators are beating the West when it comes to sophisticated information operations.”  Has advocated for “exploiting the frequent protest movements in Iran and the ever-present disgust with the regime through covert on-the-ground and digital support”.

See also
 Psy-Group
 Mueller Report
 Timeline of investigations into Trump and Russia (2018)
 Timeline of investigations into Trump and Russia (2019)

References

Donald Trump 2016 presidential campaign
People associated with the 2016 United States presidential election
People associated with Russian interference in the 2016 United States elections
Business intelligence companies
Companies based in Tel Aviv
Private detectives and investigators
Private intelligence agencies
1986 births
Living people